Gamekult is a French video game journalism website founded in December 2000. Agence Française pour le Jeu Vidéo (AFJV) described it as an iconic brand and the second largest French language video game website in 2018.

History 
The website was launched by Kévin Kuipers and Clément Apap in December 2000 while French retailer LDLC acquired a 35% stake. It was acquired by CNET Networks in January 2007. In January 2014, a management buyout was conducted by CNET France parent CBS Interactive France, creating new company CUP Interactive. Its parent Neweb was acquired by TF1 Group in October 2015. In January 2022, Les Numériques and Gamekult announced to increase their editorial collaboration. On June 29, 2022, TF1 announced it had signed an agreement with the Reworld Media group to sell its digital media division Unify (formerly Neweb), which includes Gamekult.

References

Further reading

External Links 
 

Video game websites
Internet properties established in 2000